Hajji 
Sahib Rohullah Wakil is a citizen of Afghanistan who was held in extrajudicial detention in the United States Guantanamo Bay detention camps, in Cuba.
His Guantanamo Internment Serial Number was 798.
American intelligence analysts estimate he was born in 1962, in Jalalabad, Afghanistan. He has since been transferred from Guantanamo Bay to the American wing of the Pol-e-Charkhi prison in Kabul, Afghanistan. On November 18, 2019 the U.S. Department of the Treasury designated him for supporting activities of the ISIS branch in Afghanistan.

Background
Sahib Rohullah Wakil, a leader of the Wakil tribe, and a member of Afghanistan's legislature, the Loya Jirga, who was captured on Thursday August 22, 2002.
According to the New York Times the night before his capture Rohullah had attended a dinner to honor the newly appointed Governor, and had spoken about al Qaeda.
According to the New York Times Rohullah had acknowledged it was "possible" al Qaeda was regrouping, but that he had his doubts.
The article quoted Rohullah: "I told them, 'If there are Al Qaeda, tell us and we'll take care of them. It has been three months, and they haven't caught any Al Qaeda."

Combatant Status Review Tribunal

Initially the Bush administration asserted that they could withhold all the protections of the Geneva Conventions to captives from the war on terror.  This policy was challenged before the Judicial branch. Critics argued that the USA could not evade its obligation to conduct competent tribunals to determine whether captives are, or are not, entitled to the protections of prisoner of war status.

Subsequently the Department of Defense instituted the Combatant Status Review Tribunals.  The Tribunals, however, were not authorized to determine whether the captives were lawful combatants—rather they were merely empowered to make a recommendation as to whether the captive had previously been correctly determined to match the Bush administration's definition of an enemy combatant.

Summary of Evidence memo
A Summary of Evidence memo was prepared for 
Sahib Rohullah Wakil's
Combatant Status Review Tribunal, 
on 
25 October 2004.
The memo listed the following allegations against him:

Transcript 
Wakil chose to participate in his Combatant Status Review Tribunal.
On March 3, 2006, in response to a court order from Jed Rakoff the Department of Defense published a summarized transcript from his Combatant Status Review Tribunal.

Administrative Review Board 

Detainees whose Combatant Status Review Tribunal labeled them "enemy combatants" were scheduled for annual Administrative Review Board hearings.  These hearings were designed to assess the threat a detainee might pose if released or transferred, and whether there were other factors that warranted his continued detention.

Wakil chose to participate in his Administrative Review Board hearing.

The following primary factors favor continued detention

The following primary factors favor release or transfer

Testimony

Repatriation

On April 30, 2008 nine Guantanamo captives were repatriated.
The identity of the three Sudanese captives, and the sole Moroccan were made public on the day of their repatriation.  The identity of the five Afghans did not immediately become public.

By May 5, 2008 it had become public that a captive named "Haji Rohullah" had been repatriated.
Peter M. Ryan, an attorney who had represented many Guantanamo captives, wrote that Rohullah had merely been transferred from US custody to Afghan custody `

On July 14, 2008 Ryan filed a "Motion to sever petition of Haji Rohullah Wakil" from Civil Action No. 05-cv-1124.

The Center for Constitutional Rights reports that all of the Afghans repatriated to Afghanistan from April 2007 were sent to Afghan custody in the American built and supervised wing of the Pul-e-Charkhi prison near Kabul.

Pentagon suspect that he had "returned to the fight"

On May 20, 2009, the New York Times, citing an unreleased Pentagon document, reported that Department of Defense officials claimed 
Haji Sahib Rohullah Wakil
was one of 74 former Guantanatmo captives who were suspected of "re-engagement in terrorism."
Wakil was suspected of re-engagement with terrorism because he was suspected of "an association with terrorist groups."

July 2009 McClatchy profile
Following the publication of claims in May 2009 that Wakil had ""associations with terrorist groups" Nancy A. Youssef, of the McClatchy News Service conducted an investigation into the credibility of these claims.
On July 8, 2009 she reported that Wakil was a trusted advisor of the Hamid Karzai administration.  She quoted
comments from Mirwise Yaseeni, a candidate in the upcoming Afghan Presidential elections: 

Wakil says that, following the leaked anonymous allegations, he is worried he may be detained without charge a second time, and that he carries a dossier of documents that establish his innocence.
Youssef suggested the doubts Wakil's case cast on the credibility of the DoD claims erodes the credibility of the DoD's claims against other former captives.

References

External links
Who are the Afghans just released from Guantánamo? Andy Worthington

1962 births
Living people
Bagram Theater Internment Facility detainees
Guantanamo detainees known to have been released
People from Nangarhar Province
Afghan extrajudicial prisoners of the United States